Aristolochia bracteolata also known as 'worm killer' in English due to its anthelminthic activity and trypanocidal effect, is a perennial herb growing from 10–60 cm tall. The plant is important in traditional medicine in Africa, India and the Middle East.

Distribution and ecology 
Aristolochia bracteolata grows in subsaharan regions from Mali to Somalia through to the Arabian peninsula and India. The plant grows at elevations of 50-740m above sea level and can be found on the banks of rivers, bushland, desert grasslands. It grows in sandy or lava soils.

Description 
Aristolochia bracteolata is a climbing or prostrate perennial herb with an unpleasant smell, stems 10–60 cm tall from an underground rhizome. The leaves are ovate 1.5–8 × 1.5–7 cm with a petiole 0.5–4.5 cm long. Flowers are dark purple, 0.5–5 cm tubular, with trumpet shaped mouth. Capsules are oblong-ellipsoid, 1.5–2.5 cm. Aristolochia bracteolata has been observed to have 2–3 flowers per leaf axil in Somalia, however outside Somalia the plant seems to have solitary flowers.

Cultivation 
Aristolochia bracteolata is usually gathered from the wild.

Traditional medicine 

Aristolochia bracteolata has been used in traditional medicine in Nigeria, India, and Ethiopia as an infusion of dried leaves to treat intestinal worms, skin itch, or insect bites.

References

Further reading 

 
 

bracteolata
Medicinal plants of Africa
Flora of the Indian subcontinent